Jane Elizabeth Clarke (born in 1954) is an English writer of children's books and poetry. Her best known books include Gilbert the Greatillustrated by Charles Fuge, and Neon Leon illustrated by Britta Teckentrup. Jane has published more than 80 books, including the Dr. Kittycat series for Oxford University Press, and children's reading scheme books used in schools. CBeebies Bedtime Stories have featured two of Jane's books, Stuck in the Mud (read by Dolly Parton) and Knight Time (read by Jake Wood). Stuck in the Mud is also featured with a US Scholastic Book Club edition which includes a CD audio edition. This audio edition is produced by Beatstreet Productions, NYC, directed by Cheryl Smith, read by Cassandra Morris and features music composed by Michael Abbott.

Jane Clarke is also a team writer on three different popular series for young readers. Dinosaur Cove (series created by Working Partners Ltd. and published by Oxford University Press), Puddle the Naughtiest Puppy (series created by Working Partners Ltd. and published by Ladybird Books Ltd.) and Pet Hotel (created by Random House Children's Books and published by Red Fox.)

Early life
Jane was born 17 December 1954 and brought up in Kettering, Northamptonshire, England. Her parents were Jim and June Andrew. She was a pupil at Hawthorn Road County Primary School in Kettering. In 1972 Jane completed her secondary study at the Kettering High School for Girls. From 1972 to 1975 Jane studied at the University of Birmingham where she earned a combined Bachelor of Arts with honours in archaeology and history. In 1981 she completed a PhD in archaeology from University College London.

Personal life
On 5 November 1977 Jane married Martin Clarke. Martin worked as a chemical engineer. His work took them to Mexico, Brazil, the United States, Wales and the Netherlands. Together they raised two sons, Andrew Clarke (born 15 October 1983 in Wales) and Robert Clarke (born 18 October 1985 in Wales). Both sons completed the International Baccalaureate Diploma at the Antwerp International School in Belgium and university degrees in the UK.

During her doctoral studies Jane lectured at University College London (1978–79). Thereafter she lectured at University College Cardiff in Wales part-time (1981–83), and taught history at Bryn Hafren School in Barry, Wales (1979–83). Afterwards, Jane moved with her family to Koewacht, Netherlands. She began working part-time as a librarian at the Antwerp International School. It was during this time she started her career as a children's author.

Jane's husband, Martin, died of a heart attack in Antwerp, Belgium on 20 December 2001. In June 2005, Jane moved from the Netherlands back to Kent, England where she now lives.

Aside from writing children's books, Jane spends a significant amount of time inspiring children to read and write. She frequently visits schools throughout the UK and Europe.

Jane has also supported various charitable organisations including Ellenor Lions Children's Hospice, Institute of Cancer Research (The Clapham Grand), Battersea Dogs and Cats Home and READ (promotes reading in Africa).

Awards
 Sheffield Children's Book Award – Picture Book Category (Gilbert the Great) 2006, Highly Commended
 Norfolk Library and Information Service Children's Book Award – Younger Category (Gilbert the Great) 2006, Bronze Star Winner
 Nottingham Children's Book Award for 3-5's (Stuck in the Mud) 2008

Works
Plodney Creeper, Supersloth (2001)
Sherman Swaps Shells (2001)
Only Tadpoles Have Tails (2002)
Smoky Dragons (2002)
Tusk Trouble (2003)
Dino Dog (2004)
Gilbert the Great (2005)
The Amazing Adventures of Batbird (2005)
Prince Albert's Birthday (2005)
I'm Not Wearing That! (2005)
Dippy's Sleepover (2006)
Chewy Hughie (2006)
No Nits! (2006)
Squeaky Clean (2006)
Mole and the New Hole (2006)
Muck it Up! (2006)
Trumpet: the Little Elephant with a Big Temper (2006)
Scratching’s Catching! [USA version of No Nits!] (2007)
G.E.M. (2007)
Gilbert in Deep (2007)
The Best of Both Nests (2007)
Stuck in the Mud (2008)
Runny Honey (2008)
Knight Time (2008)
Eye, Eye Captain! (2008)
Gilbert the Hero (2010)
Creaky Castle (illustrated by Christyan Fox) Simon & Schuster 2011
Dance Together Dinosaurs (illustrated by Lee Childish) Random House 2012
How to Tuck In Your Sleepy Lion (illustrated by Georgie Birkett) Random House 2015
How to Feed Your Cheeky Monkey (illustrated by Georgie Birkett) Random House 2015
How to Brush Your Teeth With Snappy Croc (illustrated by Georgie Birkett) Random House 2015
How to Bath Your Little Dinosaur (illustrated by Georgie Birkett) Random House 2015
Old Macdonald's Things That Go (illustrated by Migy Blanco) Nosy Crow 2015
Who Woke the Baby? (illustrated by Charles Fuge) Nosy Crow 2015
I Saw Anaconda (illustrated by Emma Dodd) Nosy Crow 2016
Neon Leon (illustrated by Britta Teckentrup) Nosy Crow 2017
Firefly Home (illustrated by Britta Teckentrup) Nosy Crow 2018
Leap Frog (illustrated by Britta Teckentrup) Nosy Crow 2019
Tiptoe Tiger (illustrated by Britta Teckentrup) Nosy Crow 2021

The Dr. KittyCat books, Oxford University Press:
Dr KittyCat is Ready to Rescue: Posy the Puppy 2015
Dr KittyCat is Ready to Rescue: Daisy the Kitten 2015
Dr KittyCat is Ready to Rescue: Clover the Bunny 2015
Dr KittyCat is Ready to Rescue: Willow the Duckling 2015
Dr KittyCat is Ready to Rescue: Nutmeg the Guinea Pig 2016
Dr KittyCat is Ready to Rescue: Pumpkin the Hamster 2017
Dr KittyCat is ready to rescue: Peanut the Mouse 2018
Dr KittyCat is Ready to Rescue: Ginger the Kitten 2018
Dr KittyCat is ready to rescue: Logan the Puppy 2018
Dr KittyCat is ready to rescue: Bramble the Hedgehog 2019Al's Awesome Science, Five Quills:
Al's Awesome Science: No.1: Egg-Speriments! (illustrated by James Brown) 2017
AL's Awesome Science: Splash Down!  (illustrated by James Brown) 2018
Al's Awesome Science: Blast-Off! (illustrated by James Brown) 2018
Al's Awesome Science: Busy Bodies! (illustrated by James Brown) 2019Sky Private Eye, Five Quills:
Sky Private Eye and the Case of the Runaway Biscuit: A Fairytale Mystery Starring the Gingerbread Boy Five Quills 2018
Sky Private Eye and The Case of the Sparkly Slipper: A Fairytale Mystery Starring Cinderella Five Quills 2018
Sky Private Eye and the Case of the Missing Grandma: A Fairy-Tale Mystery Starring Little Red Riding Hood Five Quills 2020Lottie Loves Nature, Five Quills:
Lottie Loves Nature: Frog Frenzy illustrated by James Brown, Five Quills 2020
Lottie Loves Nature: Bird Alert illustrated by James Brown, Five Quills 2021
Lottie Loves Nature: Bee-Ware  illustrated by James Brown, Five Quills 2021In conjunction with Random House Children's Books (The Battersea Dogs & Cats Home Series):

Rusty's Story: Battersea Dogs & Cats Home (2010)
Misty's Story: Battersea Dogs & Cats Home (2010)
Daisy's Story: Battersea Dogs & Cats Home (2010)In conjunction with Working Partners Ltd. (Dinosaur Cove Series):
Attack of the Lizard King: Dinosaur Cove 1 (as Rex Stone, 2008)
March of the Armoured Beasts: Dinosaur Cove 3 (as Rex Stone, 2008)
Catching the Speedy Thief: Dinosaur Cove 5 (as Rex Stone, 2008)
Rescuing the Plated Lizard: Dinosaur Cove 7 (as Rex Stone, 2008)
Tracking the Gigantic Beast: Dinosaur Cove 9 ( as Rex Stone, 2009)
Finding the Deceptive Dinosaur: Dinosaur Cove 11 (as Rex Stone, 2009)
Journey to the Ice Age: Dinosaur Cove Double Length Edition (as Rex Stone, 2009)
Clash of the Monster Crocs: Dinosaur Cove 14 (as Rex Stone, 2010)
Rampage of the Hungry Giants: Dinosaur Cove 15 (as Rex Stone, 2010)
Battle of the Giants: Dinosaur Cove World Book Day Edition (as Rex Stone, 2010)
Swarm of the Fanged Lizards: Dinosaur Cove 17 (as Rex Stone, 2011)
Stalking the Fanned Predator: Dinosaur Cove 19 (as Rex Stone, 2011)In Conjunction with Working Partners Ltd. (Puddle the Naughtiest Puppy Series'''):Toyshop Trouble: Puddle the Naughtiest Puppy 2 (as Hayley Daze, 2010)Rainforest Hide and Seek: Puddle the Naughtiest Puppy 4 (as Hayley Daze, 2010)Magic Mayhem: Puddle the Naughtiest Puppy 6 (as Hayley Daze, 2010)Animal Antics: Puddle the Naughtiest Puppy 8 (as Hayley Daze, 2010)Star of the School: Puddle the Naughtiest Puppy 10'' (as Hayley Daze, 2011 )

References

Organisations
 Society of Children's Book Writers and Illustrators' Group (British SCWBI)
 Deal Writers
 British Humanist Association
 Wildwood Trust

External links
 Jane Clarke's official website
 Writer's Author Profile
 Contact an Author

1954 births
Living people
British children's writers
Alumni of the University of Birmingham
Alumni of University College London
Academics of University College London
Academics of Cardiff University
People from Kettering